Drilon Paçarizi (born 22 August 1990 in Dragobil, Malishevë) is a Kosovo–born Swiss–Albanian footballer who plays for FC Meyrin in the 1. Liga Classic.

References

External links
 Profile - FC Meyrin

1989 births
Living people
People from Mališevo
Kosovo Albanians
Kosovan emigrants to Switzerland
Association football wingers
Kosovan footballers
Servette FC players
FC Meyrin players
Étoile Carouge FC players
FC Locarno players
FC Lugano players
FC Le Mont players
Swiss Super League players
Swiss Challenge League players
Swiss 1. Liga (football) players
Kosovan expatriate footballers
Expatriate footballers in Switzerland
Kosovan expatriate sportspeople in Switzerland